WEC 19: Undisputed was a mixed martial arts event held by World Extreme Cagefighting on March 17, 2006 at the Tachi Palace Hotel & Casino in Lemoore, California.  The event aired live on the HDNet Fights.

Eight past, present, or future WEC champions competed at this event, which was the most ever featured on a WEC card.

Results

See also
 World Extreme Cagefighting
 List of World Extreme Cagefighting champions
 List of WEC events
 2006 in WEC

References

External links
Official WEC website

World Extreme Cagefighting events
2006 in mixed martial arts
Mixed martial arts in California
Sports in Lemoore, California
2006 in sports in California